Thomas Brightwell DD (a.k.a. Brytwell) was an English medieval college Fellow and university Chancellor.

Brightwell was a Fellow of Merton College, Oxford and Chancellor of the University of Oxford during 1388–90. He was a Doctor of Divinity.

References

Year of birth unknown
Year of death unknown
English Christian theologians
Fellows of Merton College, Oxford
Chancellors of the University of Oxford
14th-century English people